Nuyoo Mixtec, also known as Southwestern Tlaxiaco Mixtec, is a Mixtec language of Oaxaca. It is not close to other varieties of Mixtec, but its greatest degree of intelligibility is with Atatláhuca Mixtec.

References 

Mixtec language